Seven Pillars of Wisdom is the autobiographical account of the experiences of British Army Colonel T. E. Lawrence ("Lawrence of Arabia") while serving as a military advisor to Bedouin forces during the Arab Revolt against the Ottoman Empire of 1916 to 1918.

It was completed in February 1922, but first published in December 1926.

Title and dedication
The title comes from the Book of Proverbs; "Wisdom hath builded her house, she hath hewn out her seven pillars" (King James Version). Before the First World War, Lawrence had begun work on a scholarly book about seven great cities of the Middle East, to be called Seven Pillars of Wisdom. It was incomplete when war broke out and Lawrence stated that he destroyed the manuscript. He used his original title for the later work.

The book had to be rewritten three times, once following the loss of the manuscript on a train at Reading railway station. From Seven Pillars, "... and then lost all but the Introduction and drafts of Books 9 and 10 at Reading Station, while changing trains. This was about Christmas, 1919." (p. 21)

Seven Pillars of Wisdom is an autobiographical account of his experiences during the Arab Revolt of 1916–1918, when Lawrence was based in Wadi Rum in Jordan as a member of the British Forces. With the support of Emir Faisal and his tribesmen, he helped organise and carry out attacks on the Ottoman forces from Aqaba in the south to Damascus in the north. Many sites inside the Wadi Rum area have been named after Lawrence to attract tourists, although there is little or no evidence connecting him to any of these places, including the rock formations near the entrance now known as "The Seven Pillars".

Speculation surrounds the book's dedication, a poem written by Lawrence and edited by Robert Graves, concerning whether it is to an individual or to the whole Arab race. It begins, "To S.A.", possibly meaning Selim Ahmed, a young Arab boy from Syria of whom Lawrence was very fond. Ahmed died, probably from typhus, aged 19, a few weeks before the offensive to liberate Damascus. Lawrence received the news of his death some days before he entered Damascus.

A variant last line of that first stanza—reading, "When we came"—appears in some editions; however, the 1922 Oxford text (considered the definitive version; see below) has "When I came". The poem originated as prose, submitted by letter to Graves, who edited the work heavily into its current form, rewriting an entire stanza and adjusting the others.

Manuscripts and editions

Lawrence kept extensive notes throughout the course of his involvement in the Revolt. He began work on a clean narrative in the first half of 1919 while in Paris for the Peace Conference and, later that summer, while back in Egypt. By December 1919, he had a fair draft of most of the ten books that make up the Seven Pillars of Wisdom but lost it (except for the introduction and final two books) when he misplaced his briefcase while changing trains at Reading railway station.
National newspapers alerted the public to the loss of the "hero's manuscript", but the draft was not recovered. Lawrence refers to this version as "Text I" and says that had it been published, it would have been some 250,000 words in length.

In early 1920, Lawrence set about the daunting task of rewriting as much as he could remember of the first version. Working from memory alone (he had destroyed many of his wartime notes upon completion of the corresponding parts of Text I), he was able to complete this "Text II", 400,000 words long, in three months. Lawrence described this version as "hopelessly bad" in literary terms, but historically it was "substantially complete and accurate". This manuscript, titled by Lawrence The Arab Revolt, is held by the Harry Ransom Center of the University of Texas with a letter from Lawrence's brother authenticating it as the earliest surviving manuscript of what would become Seven Pillars of Wisdom.

With Text II in front of him, Lawrence began working on a polished version ("Text III") in London, Jeddah, and Amman during 1921. Lawrence completed this text comprising 335,000 words in February 1922.

To eliminate any risk of losing the manuscript again, and to have copies that he could show privately to critics, he considered having the book typed out. However, he discovered that it would be cheaper to get the text typeset and printed on a proofing press at the Oxford Times printing works. Just eight copies were produced, of which six survive. In bibliographical terms the result was the first "edition" of Seven Pillars (because the text was reproduced on a printing press). In legal terms, however, these substitutes for a typescript were not "published". Lawrence retained ownership of all the copies and chose who was allowed to read them. The proof-printing became known as the "Oxford Text" of Seven Pillars. As a text it is unsatisfactory because Lawrence could not afford to have the proof corrected. It therefore contains innumerable transcription errors, and in places lines and even whole paragraphs are missing. He made corrections by hand in five of the copies and had them bound. (In 2001, the last time one of these rough printings came on to the market, it fetched almost US$1 million at auction.) Instead of burning the manuscript, Lawrence presented it to the Bodleian Library in Oxford.

By mid-1922, Lawrence was in a state of severe mental turmoil: the psychological after-effects of war were taking their toll, as were his exhaustion from the literary endeavours of the past three years, his disillusionment with the settlement given to his Arab comrades-in-arms, and the burdens of being in the public eye as a perceived "national hero". It was at this time that he re-enlisted in the armed forces under an assumed name, for the most part in the Royal Air Force, as described in his book The Mint with the byline "by 352087 A/c Ross", with a period in the Royal Tank Corps as "Private Shaw". Concerned over his mental state and eager for his story to be read by a wider public, his friends persuaded him to produce an abridged version of Seven Pillars, to serve as both intellectual stimulation and a source of much-needed income. In his off-duty evenings, he set to trimming the 1922 text down to 250,000 words for a subscribers' edition.

In 2022, almost a hundred years after the publication of the book, the missing part of the first book emerged, in which Lawrence expresses in a heartfelt tone his feeling of shame at how the revolt was betrayed by the colonial powers (France and United Kingdom) with the secret Sykes-Picot agreement for the partition of the Middle East. An extremely rare copy of the original manuscript, which includes the missing chapter, was auctioned in England at the starting price of £ 65,000 for the first time. With Lawrence's words: "[That was] an Arab war waged and led by Arabs for an Arab aim in Arabia … a new nation, to restore a lost influence [and build] an inspired dream palace of their national thoughts".

The Subscribers' Edition—in a limited print run of about 200 copies, each with a unique, sumptuous, hand-crafted binding—was published in late 1926, with the subtitle A Triumph. It was printed in London by Roy Manning Pike and Herbert John Hodgson, with illustrations by Eric Kennington, Augustus John, Paul Nash, Blair Hughes-Stanton and his wife Gertrude Hermes. Copies occasionally become available in the antiquarian trade and can easily command prices of up to US$100,000. Unfortunately, each copy cost Lawrence three times the thirty guineas the subscribers had paid.

The Subscribers' Edition was 25% shorter than the Oxford Text, but Lawrence did not abridge uniformly. The deletions from the early books are much less drastic than those of the later ones: for example, Book I lost 17% of its words and Book IV lost 21%, compared to 50% and 32% for Books VIII and IX. Critics differed in their opinions of the two editions: Robert Graves, E. M. Forster, and George Bernard Shaw preferred the 1922 text, although, from a legal standpoint, they appreciated the removal of certain passages that could have been considered libellous (or at least indiscreet), while Edward Garnett preferred the 1926 version.

Literary merits aside, however, producing the Subscribers' Edition had left Lawrence facing bankruptcy. He was forced to undertake an even more stringent pruning to produce a version for sale to the general public: this was the 1927 Revolt in the Desert, a work of some 130,000 words: "An abridgement of an abridgement", remarked Shaw, not without disdain. Nevertheless, it received wide acclaim by the public and critics alike, the vast majority of whom had never seen or read the less-abridged Subscribers' Edition.

After the 1926 release of the Subscribers' Edition, Lawrence stated that no further issue of Seven Pillars would be made during his lifetime. Lawrence was killed in a motorcycle accident in May 1935, at age 46; within weeks of his death, the 1926 abridgement, as well as the first unabridged US edition by Doubleday, Doran & Company, Inc., were released to the general public. The Doubleday edition was first released in a limited run of 750 copies, with a standard run released afterward. An unabridged edition would not be published again until 1997, when the unabridged Oxford Text of 1922 appeared as a "best text" edited by Jeremy Wilson from the manuscript in the Bodleian Library, alongside Lawrence's amended copy of the 1922 proof printing. Wilson made some further minor amendments in a new edition published in 2003.

Critical comments

Charles Hill has called Seven Pillars "a novel traveling under the cover of autobiography", capturing Lawrence's highly personal version of the historical events described in the book.

An advertisement for the 1935 edition quotes Churchill as saying "It ranks with the greatest books ever written in the English language. As a narrative of war and adventure it is unsurpassable."

In popular culture 
The book was adapted into the film Lawrence of Arabia (1962).

"Seven Pillars of Wisdom" is a song by power metal group Sabaton about Lawrence, released in July 2019 on the album The Great War.

In Tony Parsons’ novel, The Murder Bag (2014), the Seven Pillars is referenced as part of the curriculum at Potters Field school and has a formative influence on a group of former pupils.

Editions in print

Explanatory notes

Citations

General and cited sources

External links

 
 
 

1922 non-fiction books
1926 non-fiction books
1927 non-fiction books
Autobiographies adapted into films
Books about the Middle East
Books about the Ottoman Empire
British autobiographies
British non-fiction literature
English-language books
History books about World War I
Military autobiographies
Personal accounts of World War I
T. E. Lawrence